The following highways are numbered 622:

Canada

Costa Rica
 National Route 622

United States
 (former)